Brian Gill (born 5 June 1948) is a New Zealand cricketer. He played in one first-class match for Northern Districts in 1969/70.

See also
 List of Northern Districts representative cricketers

References

External links
 

1948 births
Living people
New Zealand cricketers
Northern Districts cricketers
Cricketers from Auckland